Infant Jesus English Medium School is an unaided school located at Thiruvambady,  from Kozhikode city in Kerala, India. It is abbreviated as IJEMS Thiruvambady. It is managed by CMC Convent Sisters in Thiruvambady.  It is a Christian minority institution using the Kerala state syllabus (English Medium) started in 1994. It is located in the heart of Thiruvambady town.

Students from Thiruvambady, Koodaranji, Pulloorampara, Punnackal, Mukkam, Thamarassery, Kodencheri, Omassery and nearby places mainly study in the school. The strength of the school is 900 students and 50 teachers. In each class there are two divisions. Sr. Soona was the former headmistress of the school. The CMC Convent sisters started Lisuex Rani Nursery School (Malayalam Medium) on 1973. English Medium Nursery was started on 1992. In 1995, Infant Jesus School got approval of government to upgrade to a high school.

See also
 Sacred Heart Forane Church Thiruvambady
 Sacred Heart HSS Thiruvambady
 St. Sebastian's School, Koodaranji

References

Catholic secondary schools in India
Christian schools in Kerala
High schools and secondary schools in Kerala
Schools in Kozhikode
1994 establishments in Kerala
Educational institutions established in 1984